Aditya Vikram Birla (14 November 1943 – 1 October 1995) was an Indian industrialist. Born into one of the largest business families of India, he oversaw the diversification of his group into textiles, petrochemicals and telecommunications. He was one of the first Indian industrialists to expand abroad, setting up plants in Southeast Asia, the Philippines and Egypt. His net worth was estimated at £250 million by 1995. His death at the age of 51 left his young son Kumar Mangalam Birla in charge of his group of companies.

Early life and education
Birla was born on 14 November 1943 in Calcutta to industrialist Basant Kumar and Sarala Birla. His grandfather Ghanshyam Das Birla was an associate of Mahatma Gandhi and had built his fortune on aluminium prospecting and as the manufacturer of the Ambassador car.

After attending St. Xavier's College, Calcutta, he earned a degree in chemical engineering at the Massachusetts Institute of Technology. He was married to Rajashri and had a daughter Vasavadatta and a son Kumar Mangalam, who now heads the Aditya Birla Group.

Aditya Vikram Birla received his Sanskrit education from the late Sanskrit scholar Shri Durga Prasad Shastri in Kolkata.

He was married to Rajashree Birla.

Career
After returning to India in 1965, Birla struck out on his own in textiles. His Eastern Spinning Mills in Calcutta (Kolkata) quickly became a success, putting the group's sinking rayon and textile business back on track. He was then placed in charge of the corporation's expansion into the oil sector.

In 1969, Birla set up Indo-Thai Synthetics Company Ltd, the group's first overseas company. In 1973, he established P.T. Elegant Textiles to manufacture spun yarn. It marked the group's first venture in Indonesia. In 1974, Thai Rayon, the Group's Viscose Rayon Staple Fibre business, was incorporated in Thailand. In 1975, The Indo Phil Group of companies, the first Indo-Filipino joint venture, commenced production of spun yarn. In 1977, Pan Century Edible Oils was incorporated in Malaysia, going on to become the world's largest single-location palm oil refinery. In 1978, Thai Carbon Black was incorporated in Thailand. In 1982, P.T. Indo Bharat Rayon was established, the first producer of Viscose Staple Fibre in Indonesia.
All these ventures not only put the Birla group on the world map, but the companies became the largest producer of Viscose staple fibre and refiner of palm oil.

Ghanshyam Das Birla died in 1983, bequeathing most of his companies to his grandson Aditya. With Aditya Vikram Birla as the chairman, the Birla group of companies success expanded Hindustan Gas and rescued Indo-Gulf Fertilisers and Chemicals Ltd.

Death
In 1993, Birla was diagnosed with prostate cancer. His aged father and young son took over many of the responsibilities of the group. The best medical treatment for prostate cancer was arranged for Birla, and including at the Johns Hopkins Hospital in Baltimore US. He spent many months at that facility, and it was there that he died on 1 October 1995. He was survived by both his parents, his wife and both his children, as also by two sisters and a daughter-in-law. Former Indian Prime Minister (then Finance Minister) Manmohan Singh called Mr. Birla "among the best and brightest citizens of India."

While battling cancer Birla's great concern was to see his daughter married. Towards this, he took recourse to long-standing friendship with the Bajaj family, the descendants of Jamnalal Bajaj, who had been a close friend of Ghanshyamdas Birla. Birla arranged for his daughter Vasavadatta to marry Kushagra Bajaj, son of Shishir Bajaj (Rahul Bajaj's younger brother) of the Bajaj family. He witnessed their engagement ceremony but not their wedding. The wedding could not be held immediately because the couple, both born in 1976, were still underage. The couple were married in 1997.

Legacy
His group instituted the Aditya Birla Scholarships in his memory.  Every year more than 40 scholars from among seven Indian Institutes of Management, seven Indian Institutes of Technology, Birla Institute of Technology and Science and Faculty of Management Studies (Delhi) receive this scholarship. From the 2012–13-year onwards, this scholarship was extended to 4 law campuses as well.

Aditya Birla Memorial Hospital in Pimpri-Chinchwad has been named after him.

The Aditya Vikram Birla won Kalashikhar and Kalakiran Puraskar awards for excellence in theatre and performing arts are given every year, were instituted in 1996 by the Sangeet Kala Kendra (SKK), which was founded in 1973 by Aditya Vikram Birla to encourage performing arts.
A special commemorative stamp has been released by Government of India in the name of Aditya Vikram Birla on 14 January 2013, honouring him as "India's first global industrialist".

Biography
 Aditya Vikram Birla, a biography by Minhaz Merchant.

Notes and references 

 A special commemorative stamp issued by postal department of India on Aditya vikram Birla

External links
 A V Birla image
 Aditya Vikram Birla on Britannica
 Aditya Birla Group Homepage

1943 births
1995 deaths
20th-century Indian businesspeople
Businesspeople from Kolkata
Indian billionaires
Rajasthani people
Aditya Vikram Birla
Indian businesspeople in textiles
Deaths from prostate cancer
Deaths from cancer in Maryland